The College of Medicine of the University of Saskatchewan is the university's medical school. The school is located in Saskatoon. It is the only medical school in the Canadian province of Saskatchewan.

Admissions
In 2014, there were 894 applicants for 100 spots in the M.D. program, with up to 90% of the class from Saskatchewan and up to 10% of the class from the rest of Canada.

Organization
A list of departments in the college:

 Anatomy & Cell Biology
 Anesthesiology
 Biochemistry
 Community Health and Epidemiology
 Family Medicine
 Medical Imaging
 Medicine
 Microbiology
 Obstetrics & Gynecology
 Oncology/Radiology
 Ophthalmology
 Pathology
 Pediatrics
 Pharmacology
 Physiology
 Physical Medicine and Rehabilitation
 Psychiatry
 School of Physical Therapy
 Surgery

#BeLikeBruce
World Pancreatic Day on November 19 is honoured with the #BeLikeBruce Memorial Pancreatic Cancer Research Fund established by Bruce Gordon's family which is housed at the College of Medicine, University of Saskatchewan.

Affiliations

College of Medicine - University of Saskatchewan is linked to a number of organizations in the province:

 H.S. Computer Laboratory IHOR Continuing Medical Education 
 Saskatchewan Stroke Research Centre Saskatoon Cancer Center Research Unit 
 The Saskatchewan Neuroscience Network(SNN) 
 Centre for Integrative Medicine

The college also offers:

 international programs - allowing students to further their studies abroad
 Aboriginal programs - Six spaces for first year students (Aboriginal Equity Program), Aboriginal Student Mentorship Program and Pre-Medicine Awards for Aboriginal Students (six awards per year).

See also
List of universities in Canada#Saskatchewan
List of synchrotron radiation facilities
University of Saskatchewan
Vaccine and Infectious Disease Organization

References

External links
University of Saskatchewan, Programs — College of Medicine

Medicine
Saskatchewan